Brian Kennedy (born 30 January 1992) is an Irish hurler who plays as a left corner-back for the Kilkenny senior team.

Born in Freshford, County Kilkenny, Kennedy first played competitive hurling whilst at school at Kilkenny CBS. He arrived on the inter-county scene at the age of seventeen when he first linked up with the Kilkenny minor team before later joining the under-21 side. Kennedy made his senior debut during the 2014 National Hurling League and quickly became a regular member of the team. Since then he has won one National Hurling League medal, one Leinster Senior Hurling Championship and one All-Ireland Senior Hurling Championship medal as a non-playing substitute.

At club level Kennedy is a one-time All-Ireland medallist in the intermediate grade with St Lachtain's.  In addition to this he has also won one Leinster medal and one championship medal.

Honours

Player
St Lachtain's
All-Ireland Intermediate Club Hurling Championship (1): 2010
Leinster Intermediate Club Hurling Championship (1): 2009
Kilkenny Intermediate Hurling Championship (1): 2009

Kilkenny
All-Ireland Senior Hurling Championship (1): 2014 (sub)
Leinster Senior Hurling Championship (1): 2014 (sub)
National Hurling League (1): 2014
Leinster Intermediate Hurling Championship (1): 2012
Leinster Under-21 Hurling Championship (1): 2012
All-Ireland Minor Hurling Championship (1): 2010
Leinster Minor Hurling Championship (1): 2010

References

1992 births
Living people
Kilkenny inter-county hurlers
St Lachtain's hurlers